Jaghan and Jeghan may refer to:
 Jaghan, Bandar Abbas
 Jaghan, Hajjiabad

See also
 Jaghin (disambiguation)